Emily Kendal Frey (born January 20, 1976, in McLean, Virginia) is an American poet.

Frey is the author of the full-length poetry collections The Grief Performance (Cleveland State University Poetry Center, 2011), Sorrow Arrow (Octopus Books, 2014), and LOVABILITY (Fonograf Editions, 2021); the chapbooks Frances (Poor Claudia, 2010), The New Planet (Mindmade Books, 2010), and Airport (Blue Hour, 2009); as well as three chapbook collaborations. Frey’s The Grief Performance was selected for the Cleveland State Poetry Center’s 2010 First Book Prize by Rae Armantrout. She also won the Poetry Society of America's 2012 Norma Farber First Book Award. Frey’s poetry also appears in journals such as Octopus and The Oregonian.

Frey received a B.A. from The Colorado College in Colorado Springs, Colorado, and an M.F.A. from Emerson College in Boston, Massachusetts. She lives in Portland, Oregon.

References

External links
 Frey interviewed by Bookslut
 Frey's poems in Octopus Magazine
 Frey named winner of the NORMA FARBER FIRST BOOK AWARD in 2012
 Frey interviewed by Omniverse
 Frey's poems on BOMBLOG
 Frey's poems in Coconut
 Frey's poems in La Petite Zine
 Frey's poems in Inknode

1976 births
Living people
Poets from Oregon
Writers from Portland, Oregon
Colorado College alumni
Emerson College alumni
American women poets
Chapbook writers
21st-century American poets
21st-century American women writers